Bo Viktor Andersson, nicknamed Bobban, (born 15 March 1951) is a retired Swedish male handball player. He was a member of the Sweden men's national handball team. He was part of the team at the 1972 Summer Olympics, playing five matches. On club level he played for Guif in Sweden.

References

1951 births
Swedish male handball players
Handball players at the 1972 Summer Olympics
Olympic handball players of Sweden
People from Eskilstuna
Living people
Sportspeople from Södermanland County